Keepapitchinin is an American history blog written by American independent historian Ardis Parshall (born 1959) who specializes in Mormon history. The site was founded in 2008, namesaked for a humorous newspaper published sporadically between 1867 and 1871 pseudonymously written by George J. Taylor, Joseph C. Rich, and Heber John Richards (the fathers of whom served at the time as LDS apostles). Parshall received an award in 2010 for her Keepapitchinin essay "Beards" from the Association of Mormon Letters and was awarded by the Bloggernacle as 2010 Best Blogger and 2008, 2009, 2012, and 2013 Best Solo Blog. Parshall's article "'Pursue, Retake & Punish’: The 1857 Santa Clara Ambush" received the 2005 Dale L. Morgan Award of the Utah State Historical Society.

For the two decades from 1993 until 2013, Parshall provided extensive professional research, editorial and administrative assistance to fellow independent historian William P. MacKinnon in delving through Utah-based records archives especially in reference to the U.S. military expedition known in the mid-19th century the "Mormon Rebellion" and locally within the then State of Deseret as "Johnston's Army." (Note. MacKinnon has also written Keepapitchinin guest posts.)

According to a 2019 Salt Lake City Tribune article, over the years Keepapitchinin's content "has appeared, unattributed, in newsletters, magazines, blogs, books and other volumes. Several 'stolen posts' were abbreviated versions of papers Parshall presented at professional meetings, including the Mormon History Association." Historian Matthew Grow stated "perhaps the best biographical writing on international Mormons resides on Ardis Parshall’s blog Keepapitchinin."

Author's other works 
Parshall has coedited or written

[In progress]: She Shall Be an Ensign: A history of the LDS Church told through the lives of Mormon women

See also 
 Mormon blogosphere

References

External links 
 Keepapitchinin'
 
Audio interviews of author
By the Salt Lake Tribune
'Mormon Land': Brigham Young
 'Mormon Land': How historian Ardis Parshall’s labor of love is putting a human face on souls lost during a previous pandemic
 By Brigham Young University's Maxwell Institute
 By LeadingSaints.org

21st-century American non-fiction writers
History websites of the United States
American columnists
American Latter Day Saint writers
American women historians
Historians of the American West
Historians of the Latter Day Saint movement
Internet properties established in 2008
Latter Day Saints from Utah
Mormon bloggers
Mormon studies
Mass media in Utah
History of women in the United States
Writers from Salt Lake City
21st-century American women writers